Benedict Uloko (born 19 March 1984) is a Nigerian weightlifter competing in the 85 kg category.

He competed at the 2007 All-Africa Games, but did not finish.

At the 2008 African Championships he won overall gold with a total of 341 kg.

He competed in Weightlifting at the 2008 Summer Olympics in the 85 kg category finishing 13th with 339 kg.

At the Commonwealth Games, he won the bronze medal for Nigeria, just being beaten by Scotland's Peter Kirkbride.

Notes and references

External links
 Athlete Biography at beijing2008

Nigerian male weightlifters
1984 births
Living people
Weightlifters at the 2008 Summer Olympics
Olympic weightlifters of Nigeria
Weightlifters at the 2010 Commonwealth Games
Commonwealth Games medallists in weightlifting
Commonwealth Games bronze medallists for Nigeria
20th-century Nigerian people
21st-century Nigerian people
Medallists at the 2010 Commonwealth Games